Churromania is an international franchise of churro stores founded by Venezuelan Ariel Acosta-Rubio, his wife Maria Alejandra Bravo, and Miguel Bravo in 1997. 

Churromania is owned and operated by ChurroMania International Holding, LLC, and currently has more than 120 franchises in Venezuela, the US and a few other Latin American countries.

History
Ariel Acosta-Rubio and Maria Alejandra Bravo opened their first churro stand in Anzoátegui, Puerto La Cruz, a city in Venezuela. After experiencing mild success in the endeavor they set themselves a goal to "take Churromania to each corner of Venezuela and the World."

With the second store open popularity grew across the country and Churromania was able to open 15 more stores in less than a year and a half. Now based in Miami, Florida, the power couple, Co-Founder Acosta-Rubio and his wife Maria Bravo have opened up approximately 120 more stores and started marketing themselves nationally with the inclusion of American-based franchises having the Hispanic market as their main target. The organization began US operations in 2001 in Miami.

See also
 List of Spanish restaurants

References

Companies based in Miami
Doughnut shops
Spanish restaurants
Venezuelan American
Venezuelan cuisine
Venezuelan brands
Restaurant chains in  Venezuela